Renato del Prado (January 26, 1940 – November 1, 2013) was a Filipino film actor.

Early life
Born Renato Natividad-Mateo on March 17, 1940 in Manila.

Personal life
He was married with 6 children. His youngest son, Janus is also both a film and television actor.

Career
Renato Del Prado was discovered by Sampaguita producer Jose Vera-Perez in the 1960s.

Among his films were Tansan vs. Tarsan with Dolphy, Ang Mahiwagang Mundo ni Lola Sinderella with Amalia Fuentes and My Beloved with Nora Aunor. The older Del Prado was best known for his role as Guido in the GMA Network soap Anna Liza in the 1980s. His last film was Lapu-Lapu, which starred Lito Lapid in 2002.

Filmography

Actor
1964 Umibig Ay Di Biro
1964 From Tokyo with Love 
1964 Kumander Judo
1964 Anak ni Kamagong
1965 Isinulat sa Dugo
1965 Hamon sa Kampeon
1965 Walis ni Tenteng
1965 Iginuhit ng Tadhana: The Ferdinand E. Marcos Story
1965 Magnificent Bakya
1966 O!... Kay laking eskandalo!
1966 Mga Pag-ibig ni Christine
1967 Special Forces
1967 Philcag in Vietnam 
1967 Double Date
1967 7 Bullets for Gringo
1967 Sino ang Dapat Sisihin?
1967 The Son of Dyango Meets Dorango Kid
1967 Hammerhead
1968 Quinto de Alas
1968 Pitong Krus ng Isang Ina
1968 Mga Tigre sa Looban
1968 Magic Guitar
1968 Dalawang Mukha ng Anghel
1969 Kababalaghan
1969 Si Darna at ang Planetman
1970 Gutom
1970 Master Stuntman
1970 Dream of Jeanne
1970 Munting Santa
1970 The Bold and the Beauties
1970 Silang Tatlo
1970 Alamo Scouts
1970 Mga Lihim ni Magdalena
1970 My Dearest Mama
1970 My Beloved
1971 Jezebel
1971 Pigilin Mo ang Umaga
1971 Bawat Saglit... Kaligayahan
1971 Init sa Magdamag
1971 Kababalaghan
1971 Sophia
1971 Nagbagong Landas
1971 Sino...?
1971 Racquel
1971 She Walked by Night
1972 Isla de Toro
1972 Tomas Brusko 
1972 Banal na sandata
1972 Kung matapang ka!
1972 Roulette
1972 Jungle Fighters
1972 Pinokyo en Little Snow White
1972 Apat sa silya elektrika
1972 Naku Poooo!
1973 Prinsipe Abante
1974 Shazam Boom
1974 Ulong Pugot... naglalagot!
1974 Hotline
1974 Kapitan Eddie Set
1976 Bergado, Terror of Cavite
1976 Type na Type Kita
1976 Ang Lihim ni Rosa Henson sa Buhay ni Kumander Lawin
1976 Bitayin si... Baby Ama!
1977 Gulapa
1977 Mr. Wong and the Bionic Girls
1977 Tutol ang Lupa sa Patak ng Ulan
1978 Flordeluna - Eric 
1978 Malabanan
1978 Salonga 
1979 Tatay na barok
1980 Anna Liza - Guido 
1980 Alyas Tiagong Lundag
1981 Takbo... Peter... Takbo!  
1981 Hari ng Stunt
1981 Lukso ng Dugo
1981 Boni & Klayd
1981 Iligpit: Pepe Magtanggol
1981 Labanang Lalaki
1981 Tacio
1982 Stepanio
1982 Get My Son Dead or Alive - Ka Rodrigo
1982 Daniel Bartolo ng Sapang Bato
1982 The Victim
1982 Tokwa't Baboy
1982 Isaac... Dugo ni Abraham - Digo 
1983 E.T. Is Estong Tutong - Nato 
1983 Aking prince charming
1983 Gamu-gamo sa Pugad Lawin - Rufo
1983 To Love Again 
1983 Sgt. Maximo Velayo: Trigger ng mga Kumander 
1983 Kunin Mo ang Ulo ni Magtanggol 
1983 Estong Tutong: Ikalawang Yugto - Nato
1984 Nardong Putik (Kilabot ng Cavite) Version II 
1984 Minanong Magat
1984 Condemned - Rapist
1984 Muntinlupa 
1984 Digmaan sa Pagitan ng Lagit at Lupa 
1984 Death Raiders 
1985 Rambuto 
1985 Isang Platitong Mani (as Renato Guido Del Prado)
1985 Ben Tumbling: A People's Journal Story - Tinyente
1985 Bilang Na ang Oras Mo
1985 Manila Gang War
1985 Isa-isa Lang! - Sgt. Vera Cruz (uncredited)
1985 White Slavery
1985 Celeste Gang
1985 Anak ng Tondo - Binong Bulol
1985 Jandro Nakpil: Halang ang Kaluluwa
1985 High Blood
1985 Ben Zapanta ... Ilibing ng Buhay?
1985 Paradise Inn
1985 Isusumpa Mo ang Araw Nang Isilang Ka
1986 Iyo ang Tondo, Kanya ang Cavite - Hildo
1986 Isa Lang ang Dapat Mabuhay
1986 Isang Kumot Tatlong Unan
1986 Anomalya ni Andres de Saya
1986 Muslim .357
1986 Agaw Armas
1986 Pepe Saclao: Public Enemy No. 1 - Simon
1986 Blood War
1986 Jailbreak 1958
1986 Durugin ang Kutsng Buto
1986 Beloy Montemayor
1987 Ultimatum: Ceasefire!
1987 Lost and Found Command: Rebels Without Because - Sur Dimawari
1987 Family Tree - Gambling Lord
1987 Balandra Crossing
1987 Nonoy Garote and the Sidekicks
1987 Action Is Not Missing
1988 Dongalo Massacre
1988 Target... Maganto
1988 Gorio Punasan, Rebel Driver
1988 Joaquin Burdado
1988 Puso sa Puso
1988 Boy Negro - Tiyo Maning 
1988 Kambal Na Kamao: Madugong Engkwentro
1988 Sgt. Ernesto 'Boy' Ybañez: Tirtir Gang - Tata
1988 Arturo Lualhati
1988 Iyo ang Batas, Akin ang Katarungan - Selmo 
1988 Hamunin ang Bukas...
1988 Pepeng Kuryente: Man with a Thousand Volts - Siso
1988 Chinatown: Sa Kuko ng Dragon
1988 Kumander Anting-Anting
1988 Code Name: Black & White
1989 Alex Boncayao Brigade: The Liquidation Arm of the NPA
1989 Capt. Jaylo: Batas sa Batas
1989 Eagle Squad
1989 Sgt. Melgar - Esteng
1989 Delima Gang - Alfredo
1989 Bawat Patak ... Dugong Pilipino
1989 Gawa Na ang Bala para sa Akin - Capt. Puten
1989 Jones Bridge Massacre (Task Force Clabio)
1989 Isang Bala, Isang Buhay
1989 Target... Police General: Major General Alfredo Lim Story
1990 Urbanito Dizon: The Most Notorious Gangster in Luzon - Gary
1990 Kapag Wala Nang Batas
1990 Karapatan Ko ang Pumatay! -Kapitan Guti
1990 Naughty Boys
1990 Apoy sa Lupang Hinirang 
1990 Alyas Pogi: Birador ng Nueva Ecija - Guido 
1990 Kaaway ng Batas - Don Pedro's Man 
1990 May Araw Ka Rin Bagallon 
1990 Lover's Delight
1990 Valiente 
1991 Pretty Boy Hoodlum
1991 Markang Bungo: The Bobby Ortega Story
1991 Manong Gang - Right-hand man of Andro
1991 Mabuting Kaibigan, Masamang Kaaway - Dodong
1991 Kidlat ng Maynila: Joe Pring 2 - Paeng
1991 Dinampot Ka Lang sa Putik
1991 Medal of Valor: Lt. Jack Moreno - Habang Nasusugatan Lalong Tumatapang
1991 Batas ng .45 - Butch
1992 Pangako Sa'yo
1992 Dito sa Pitong Gatang
1992 Mukhang Bungo: Da Coconut Nut
1992 Kamay ni Cain
1992 Lucio Margallo - Pedring
1992 Magdaleno Orbos: Sa Kuko ng Mga Lawin
1992 Totoy Guwapo: Alyas Kanto Boy - Stepfather
1992 Rosang Tatoo
1992 Lacson, Batas ng Navotas
1992 Kahit Buhay Ko...
1992 Amang Capulong - Anak ng Tondo II
1992 Anak ng Dagat
1993 Patapon
1993 The Vizconde Massacre Story (God Help Us!)
1993 Manila Boy - Alvarez Henchman
1993 The Myrna Diones Story (Lord, Have Mercy!)
1993 Silang Mga Sisiw sa Lansangan
1993 Tumbasan Mo ng Buhay
1994 Talahib at Rosas
1994 Mayor Cesar Climaco
1994 Ka Hector - Ka Enchong
1994 Baby Paterno (Dugong Pulis)
1994 Ismael Zacarias - Pol
1994 Lagalag: The Eddie Fernandez Story - Prison Guard
1994 Nagkataon... Nagkatagpo - Guzman's Man
1994 Iukit Mo sa Bala! - Julian
1994 Ang Ika-labing Isang Utos: Mahalin Mo, Asawa Mo - Turing
1995 Matinik Na Kalaban
1995 Costales - Kapitan
1995 I Love You Sabado!!! - Syndicate men
1995 Silakbo - Mang Pete
1996 Kristo - Pariseo
1996 Huwag Mong Isuko ang Laban
1996 Hagedorn
1996 Lahar
1996 Masamang Damo
1997 Walang Dayaan Akin ang Malaki
1997 Buhay Mo'y Buhay Ko Rin
1997 Boy Chico: Hulihin si Ben Tumbling
1997 Casamento de Conveniência - Ambo
1997 Ipaglaban Mo II: The movie - Tiyo Pilong (episode 1)
1997 Epimaco Velasco: NBI - Kidnapper
1997 Ang Probinsyano - Natong Luga
1998 Pagbabalik ng Probinsyano - Natong Luga
1998 My Guardian Debil - Mang Pete
1998 Berdugo - Mang Rene
1999 Bayad Puri
2000 Leon ng Maynila, Lt. Col. Romeo Maganto
2001 Mahal Kita... Kahit Sino Ka Pa!
2001 Radyo - Policeman
2002 Bugso (TV Movie)
2002 Forevermore - Pedro
2002 Hibla
2002 Lapu-Lapu - Itong

Death
Del Prado died on November 1, 2013 in California due to colon cancer, his daughter, entertainment reporter Pilar Mateo, told the Inquirer. He was 73. Del Prado, who migrated to the United States in 2005, will be buried at Glen Abbey Memorial Park this week, said Mateo.

References

1940 births
2013 deaths
Deaths from cancer in the Philippines
Deaths from colorectal cancer
Filipino male film actors
Male actors from Manila